Otterington may refer to:

Otterington railway station, formerly located in the village of South Otterington, North Yorkshire, on the East Coast Main Line
South Otterington, a village in the Hambleton district of North Yorkshire, England
North Otterington, a village in the Hambleton district of North Yorkshire, England.
Otterington (horse), winner of the St Leger Stakes in 1812